SUCH TV is a television network based in Pakistan. It is a news and current affairs TV channel with an aim of bringing unbiased and factual information. It is on the centrist/left-of-center of the political spectrum with a pro-nationalist outlook and generally supported PTI and its Chairman Khan on most issues.

SUCH TV started broadcasting on 23 March 2010. Such TV will display broadcast to the public, keeping in view  its principles and conducts of electronic media.

Protest and Notice 
Media workers staged a demonstration on  November 29, 2016 outside the Punjab Assembly in protest at the suspension of two TV channels’ licenses and a fine on another by the Pakistan Electronic Media Regulatory Authority (PEMRA). Office-bearers and members of the Pakistan Federal Union of Journalists (PFUJ), Punjab Union of Journalists, Lahore Press Club, Electronic Media Reporters Association, and Electronic News Cameramen Association gathered at Charing Cross at around 3 PM. From there, they marched on the Punjab Assembly gate and staged a sit-in there.

PEMRA had, on November 19, issued notices to Neo TV, Din News, and Such TV for telecasting irresponsible contents and, on Nov 26, suspended the licenses of Neo TV and Din News for some period. A fine of Rs1 million each was also imposed on the three channels.

Programs
 Aaj Ka Such
 Such Baat
 Chalain dekhtain hain
 News Hour
 Such Savera
 Goya
 Awam Ka Such
 Aaj Kay Akhbar
 Sada E Kashmir
 Sehat Zindagi
 Football Pulse
 Gilgit Baltistan Affairs
 Asal Baat
 Play Field
 Talk @ 7

Controversies 
Pakistan Tehreek-e-Insaf (PTI) MNA Kanwal Shauzab has taken anchor Batool Rajpoot hostage at her home, asking her to delete the interview that she conducted with the lawmaker.

Journalist Hamid Mir tweeted that he received a message from the journalist who told him about the incident.He shared screenshots of the messages from the journalist. In one message, she said Kanwal’s husband was also present and that Kanwal was ‘literally fighting’ with her.
“She is not letting me leave her house”, Batool wrote to Hamid Mir. “She says delete the interview and go”.

In response, Kanwal Shauzab posted a video on Twitter in which she denied she had kidnapped Batool and attempted to explain the incident.

The MNA said that Batool had asked a question which Kanwal did not want to answer. 
Batool termed the claims as a publicity stunt, and said that Batool had gone to her home and harassed her, denying the allegation that the journalist had been forcibly detained.

The exchange has been criticized by journalists and members of the press, who termed the exchange ‘reprehensible’ and ‘condemn-able’.

See also

 List of news channels in Pakistan

References

External links 

Television channels and stations established in 2010
2010 establishments in Pakistan
Pakistan
Television stations in Pakistan
Television stations in Islamabad